Eterna is a 2022 Spanish documentary film directed by Juanma Sayalonga and  about the life of feminist rapper-poet Gata Cattana.

Plot 
The documentary concerns about the depiction of key points of the life of Ana Isabel García Llorente (aka Gata Cattana; aka Ana Sforza), with interventions by the likes of Juancho Marqués, Alejandra Martínez de Miguel,  and Mala Rodríguez.

Production 
A  Entertainment, VivaTodo Films, and Cinnamon Factory production, the project began development soon after the death of Ana Isabel García Llorente in 2017. It received funding via crowdfunding.

Release 
The film premiered at Teatro Lope de Vega within the Seville European Film Festival's 'Panorama Andaluz' film slate on 7 November 2022. It also screened at the Huelva Ibero-American Film Festival. Distributed by 39 Escalones, it was released theatrically in Spain on 2 March 2023.

Accolades 

|-
| align = "center" | 2023 || 2nd Carmen Awards || Best New Director || Juanma Sayalonga, David Sainz ||  || align = "center" | 
|}

See also 
 List of Spanish films of 2023

References 

Spanish documentary films
2022 documentary films
2020s Spanish-language films
2020s Spanish films
Documentary films about women in music
Documentary films about poets
Documentary films about women writers
Documentary films about feminism